Reichenbachia is a genus of ant-loving beetles in the family Staphylinidae. There are at least 70 described species in Reichenbachia.

Species

References

Further reading

 
 
 
 
 
 
 

Pselaphinae